The following are the highest-grossing Nigerian films of all time in Nigerian cinemas. Revenues from special screenings, DVD sales, online streaming and theatrical screenings outside English-speaking West Africa are excluded from this gross total. Films from this list have not been adjusted for inflation.

List 
Highlight  indicates films still running in theatres

By year

See also

 Lists of highest-grossing films

References 

Highest grossing
Nigeria